Youth in Danger (Swedish: Ungdom i fara) is a 1946 Swedish drama film directed by Per G. Holmgren and starring Kenne Fant, Gunnar Sjöberg and Sven-Eric Gamble. It was shot at the Malmö Studios of Svensk Talfilm. The film's sets were designed by art director Nils Nilsson.

Synopsis
A young man is charged with car theft, but is acquitted in court. A social worker is assigned to help him reform, but his hopes to lead an honest life are threatened when an old criminal acquaintance turns up.

Cast
 Kenne Fant as 	Wille Nilsson
 Nita Värhammar as 	Karin
 Gunnar Sjöberg as 	Bo Wärn
 Sven-Eric Gamble as Ärret
 Anders Andelius as 	Pluto
 Åke Askner as 	Skägget
 Börje Blomberg as 	Råttan
 Thure Carlman as 	Villes far
 Barbro Hiort af Ornäs as 	Bibbi Nicklasson
 Jarl Kulle as Jänkarn
 Otto Landahl as 	Verkstadschefen
 Bo Lindström as 	Verkmästaren
 Margot Lindén as 	Kickan
 Mimi Nelson as 	Maggi
 Lennart Nyberg as 	Skrattis
 Per Oscarsson as 	Stickan
 Anna-Stina Osslund as 	Britt
 Johan Rosén as Kumpanen
 Stina Ståhle as Märren
 Hans Sundberg as 	Frotte
 Richard Svanström as 	Direktör Axelsson
 Kurt Willbing as 	Frasse
 Fylgia Zadig as 	Baby
 Britt Ångström as 	Tony
 Nils Åsblom as 	Lillen
 Tom Österholm as 	Gotland

References

Bibliography 
 Iverson, Gunnar, Soderbergh Widding, Astrid & Soila, Tytti. Nordic National Cinemas. Routledge, 2005.

External links 
 

1946 films
Swedish drama films
1946 drama films
1940s Swedish-language films
Films directed by Per G. Holmgren
Swedish black-and-white films
1940s Swedish films